Robert Dureville (born 26 November 1943 in Paris) is a French figure skater. He is a six-time (1962–1967) French silver medalist. He represented France at the 1964 Winter Olympics, where he placed 17th.

Competitive highlights

References

 French Championships Medalists
 Sports-reference profile

External links

French male single skaters
Olympic figure skaters of France
Figure skaters at the 1964 Winter Olympics
1943 births
Living people
Figure skaters from Paris